Mamba is a genus of snakes.

Mamba may also refer to:

Arts and entertainment 
 Mamba (film), 1930 film
 Mamba (band), a Finnish band founded in 1984
 Mamba, the name of a board game in the horror film Open Graves
 MAMBA, the Buenos Aires Museum of Modern Art

Military and aviation 
 Mamba APC, an armoured personnel carrier
 Mamba (pistol), Rhodesian 9 mm automatic pistol
 Armstrong Siddeley Mamba, an aircraft engine
 Mamba, a variant of the Cobra anti-tank missile
 MAMBA, a British counter-battery radar system

Places 
 Mamba, Tibet, a town
 Mamba (Tanzanian ward), a ward in Tanzania
 Mamba, a village in Ancharakandy, Kannur, in Kerala, India
 Mamba Point, zone in Monrovia, Liberia, north of Cape Mesurado

Other uses 
 Kobe Bryant
 Mamba (website), a Russian social dating website
 Mamba (roller coaster), in Missouri, US
 Mamba (surname), a surname (including a list of people with the name)
 Mamba, a wireless gaming mouse from manufacturer Razer USA
 Mamba (candy), a fruit flavored candy manufactured by August Storck KG
 Mapungubwe Mambas, South Africa field hockey club

See also
 Black mamba (disambiguation)
 White Mamba (disambiguation)
 Red Mamba, nickname of Matt Bonner
 Mambo (disambiguation)